The nettle pouch gall develops in leaf veins, leaf petioles, flower stalks and sometimes the stem of Urtica dioica and Urtica urens. This structure is caused by the gall midge or gnat Dasineura urticae, also spelled Dasyneura urticae. Synonyms are Perrisia urticae and Cecidomyia urticae.

Physical appearance of the galls

The galls are irregularly shaped, smooth, often shiny, and coloured from purplish to pale green, exhibiting thickened walls, with a narrow slit-shaped opening, normally on the underside. The size is from 3–8 mm. A number of galls are often found next to each other on the same or different plant structures, and they may coalesce. The galls are mainly found around the growing apex and exhibit a wide range of forms, dependent on the organ in which they are situated.

Life-cycle

Several, or sometimes one white larva is found in each gall, feeding upon the plant tissues. The galls are first seen in May, mature in the autumn, at which point the larvae leave the pouch gall and pupate in the ground. The adults emerge in the following spring and the cycle starts again.

Predators and inquilines
A common gall; red, pink or orange larvae are sometimes also found within the pouch of the galls. These larvae are predator or inquiline cecids flies.

Distribution
The nettle pouch gall shows a scattered distribution throughout the United Kingdom and is under recorded.

References

Sources
 Darlington, Arnold (1968). The Pocket Encyclopaedia of Plant Galls in colour. Pub. Blandford Press. Dorset. 
 Redfern, Margaret & Shirley, Peter (2002). British Plant Galls. Identification of galls on plants & fungi. AIDGAP. Shrewsbury : Field Studies Council. .
 Stubbs, F. B. Edit. (1986) Provisional Keys to British Plant Galls. Pub. Brit Plant Gall Soc. .

External links

 Google Images
 Taxonomy

Cecidomyiinae
Gall-inducing insects
Insects described in 1840
Nematoceran flies of Europe